Anthony Charles Gregory (16 May 1937 – 10 January 2021) was an English football player, coach and manager. He played as a wing half and as a winger.

Career
During his career he played for Vauxhall Motors, Luton Town, Watford, Bexley United, Bedford Town, Hastings United and Dover. He also served as a player-coach for Hamilton Steelers and Barnet, and as player-manager for Stevenage Town and Wolverton.

During his career, Gregory represented his country at youth level, was a losing finalist with Luton in the 1959 FA Cup Final, and helped Watford to promotion in the 1959–60 season.

On 12 January 2021, it was announced that he had died at the age of 83.

References 

1937 births
2021 deaths
Vauxhall Motors F.C. players
Luton Town F.C. players
Watford F.C. players
Bedford Town F.C. players
Hastings United F.C. (1948) players
Dover F.C. players
Barnet F.C. players
Bexley United F.C. players
Association football midfielders
English footballers
FA Cup Final players